This is a list of rural localities in Belgorod Oblast. Belgorod Oblast (Belgorodskaya oblast) is a federal subject of Russia (an oblast). Its administrative center is the city of Belgorod. Population: 1,532,526 (2010 Census results).

Alexeyevsky District 
Rural localities in Alexeyevsky District

 Afanasyevka
 Alexeyenkovo
 Aleynikovo
 Babichev
 Batlukov
 Belozorovo
 Berezhnoy
 Beryozki
 Blizhneye Chesnochnoye
 Bozhkovo
 Bublikovo
 Cherepov
 Chuprinino
 Dalneye Chesnochnoye
 Dudchin
 Garbuzovo
 Gerashchenkovo
 Gezov
 Glukhovka
 Golubinsky
 Gorodishche
 Grechanikov
 Ignatov
 Ilovka
 Ilyinka
 Ivashchenko
 Kalitva
 Kamyshevatoye
 Khlevishche
 Khmyzovka
 Khreshchyaty
 Kirichenkov
 Klimov
 Koltunovka
 Kopanets
 Kovalevo
 Krasnoye
 Kuleshov
 Kupriyanov
 Kushchino
 Lesikovka
 Lutsenkovo
 Matryono-Gezovo
 Menyaylovo
 Mikhouderovka
 Nadezhdovka
 Nemenushchy
 Nikolayevka
 Nikolayevka
 Novosyolovka
 Orlov
 Osadcheye
 Osmakov
 Papushin
 Pirogovo
 Podseredneye
 Pokladov
 Popov
 Pyshnograyev
 Redkodub
 Repenka
 Reznikov
 Rybalkin
 Seroshtanov
 Shaporevo
 Shaposhnikov
 Shcherbakovo
 Shelushin
 Shkuropatov
 Sidorkin
 Slavgorodskoye
 Solomakhin
 Sovetskoye
 Stanichnoye
 Studeny Kolodets
 Syrovatsky
 Tarakanov
 Teplinka
 Tyutyunikovo
 Varvarovka
 Vasilchenkov
 Vlasov
 Vorobyovo
 Zapolnoye
 Zhukovo
 Zvarykino

Belgorodsky District 
Rural localities in Belgorodsky District:

 Belomestnoye
 Belovskoye
 Blizhnyaya Igumenka
 Dolbino
 Dubovoye
 Golovino
 Karnaukhovka
 Khokhlovo
 Komsomolsky
 Krasny Khutor
 Krasny Oktyabr
 Malinovka
 Maysky
 Myasoyedovo
 Nekhoteyevka
 Nikolskoye
 Nizhny Olshanets
 Novosadovy
 Petrovka
 Pushkarnoye
 Repnoye
 Shchetinovka
 Solokhi
 Solomino
 Streletskoye
 Tavrovo
 Tolokonnoye
 Ugrim
 Vesyolaya Lopan
 Yasnye Zori
 Yerik
 Zelyonaya Polyana
 Zhuravlyovka

Borisovsky District 
Rural localities in Borisovsky District:

 Akulinovka
 Baytsury
 Belenkoye
 Berezovka
 Gruzskoye
 Khotmyzhsk
 Krasny Kutok
 Kryukovo
 Oktyabrskaya Gotnya
 Striguny

Chernyansky District 
Rural localities in Chernyansky District:

 Kochegury
 Krasny Ostrov
 Krasny Vyselok
 Novorechye
 Ogibnoye
 Okuni
 Olshanka
 Russkaya Khalan
 Volokonovka
 Zakharovo

Grayvoronsky District 
Rural localities in Grayvoronsky District:

 Bezymeno
 Chapayevsky
 Dobroivanovka
 Dobropolye
 Dorogoshch
 Dronovka
 Dunayka
 Golovchino
 Gora-Podol
 Gorkovsky
 Ivanovskaya Lisitsa
 Khotmyzhsk
 Kozinka
 Mokraya Orlovka
 Novostroyevka-Pervaya
 Pokachevo
 Smorodino
 Sovkhozny

Gubkinsky District 
Rural localities in Gubkinsky District:

 Bobrovy Dvory
 Istobnoye
 Ivanovka
 Kochki
 Morozovo
 Nikanorovka
 Ryabinovka
 Skorodnoye
 Tolstoye
 Troitsky
 Yuryevka
 Zagorny
 Zapovedny
 Zaytsevo

Ivnyansky District 
Rural localities in Ivnyansky District:

 Kirovsky
 Kurasovka
 Verkhopenye

Korochansky District 
Rural localities in Korochansky District:

 Afanasovo
 Alexeyevka
 Annovka
 Bekhteyevo
 Bolshaya Khalan
 Bubnovo
 Foshchevatoye
 Kazanka
 Klinovets
 Korotkoye
 Koshcheyevo
 Lomovo
 Melikhovo
 Michurinsky
 Nechayevo
 Novaya Slobodka
 Ploskoye
 Plotavets
 Pogorelovka
 Popovka
 Prokhodnoye
 Sheino
 Shlyakhovo
 Sokolovka
 Ternovoye
 Ushakovo
 Yablonovo
 Zayachye
 Zhigaylovka

Krasnensky District 
Rural localities in Krasnensky District:

 Kalinin
 Krasnoye
 Lesnoye Ukolovo
 Novosoldatka
 Svistovka
 Verbnoye

Krasnogvardeysky District 
Rural localities in Krasnogvardeysky District

 Arnautovo
 Biryuch
 Foshchevaty
 Gorovoye
 Gredyakino
 Kalinovo
 Kolomytsevo
 Livenka
 Maryevka
 Nikitovka
 Nizhnyaya Pokrovka
 Novokhutornoye
 Palatovo
 Podgorskoye
 Razdornoye
 Repenka
 Sadki
 Streletskoye
 Utochka
 Valuy
 Valuychik
 Verkhnyaya Pokrovka
 Verkhososna
 Vesyoloye
 Zasosna

Krasnoyaruzhsky District 
Rural localities in Krasnoyaruzhsky District:

 Bytsenkov
 Dubino
 Grafovka
 Ilek-Penkovka
 Kolotilovka
 Prilesye
 Repyakhovka
 Sergiyevka
 Terebreno
 Vyazovoye
 Zadorozhny

Novooskolsky District 
Rural localities in Novooskolsky District:

 Belomestnoye
 Golubino
 Kositsino
 Mospanov
 Nemtsevo
 Polevoy
 Pribrezhny
 Rudny
 Sharapovka
 Staraya Bezginka
 Trostenets
 Yarskoye

Prokhorovsky District 
Rural localities in Prokhorovsky District:

 Andreyevka
 Belenikhino
 Beregovoye-Pervoye
 Bolshoye
 Donets
 Gnezdilovka
 Gryaznoye
 Kartashyovka
 Kazachye
 Kholodnoye
 Kolomytsevo
 Kondrovka
 Krasnoye
 Krivosheyevka
 Krivye Balki
 Luchki
 Maloyablonovo
 Malye Mayachki
 Maslovka
 Niva
 Pereleski
 Petrovka
 Plota
 Plyushchiny
 Podolkhi
 Podyarugi
 Prelestnoye
 Prigorki
 Priznachnoye
 Radkovka
 Rzhavets
 Sagaydachnoye
 Seymitsa
 Shakhovo
 Studyony
 Suvorovo
 Teterevino
 Vesyoly
 Vyazovoye
 Zarnitsy
 Zhuravka-Pervaya

Rakityansky District 
Rural localities in Rakityansky District:

 Bobrava
 Chistopolye
 Dmitriyevka
 Dontsov
 Ilyok-Koshary
 Nizhniye Peny
 Novozinaidinskoye
 Soldatskoye
 Sumovsky
 Svyatoslavka
 Trefilovka
 Tsentralnoye
 Vengerovka
 Vvedenskaya Gotnya
 Vvedensky
 Vyshniye Peny
 Zinaidino

Rovensky District 
Rural localities in Rovensky District

 Aydar
 Kharkovskoye
 Ladomirovka
 Loznaya
 Lozovoye
 Nagolnoye
 Nagorye
 Novoalexandrovka
 Rzhevka
 Svistovka
 Verkhnyaya Serebryanka

Shebekinsky District 
Rural localities in Shebekinsky District:

 Alexandrovka
 Arkhangelskoye
 Babenkov
 Bely Kolodez
 Belyanka
 Bershakovo
 Bezlyudovka
 Bolshetroitskoye
 Bolshoye Gorodishche
 Bulanovka
 Churayevo
 Dmitriyevka
 Dubovenka
 Grafovka
 Gremyachy
 Koshlakovo
 Kozmodemyanovka
 Krapivnoye
 Kupino
 Malomikhaylovka
 Maximovka
 Meshkovoye
 Murom
 Nezhegol
 Novaya Tavolzhanka
 Novaya Zarya
 Ognishchevo
 Pervoye Tseplyayevo
 Popovka
 Rzhevka
 Strelitsa-Pervaya
 Surkovo
 Verkhneye Beryozovo
 Voznesenovka
 Zhelobok
 Ziborovka
 Zimovnoye

Starooskolsky District 
Rural localities in Starooskolsky District:

 Anpilovka
 Arkhangelskoye
 Babanika
 Bocharovka
 Borovaya
 Chernikovo
 Chumaki
 Chuzhikovo
 Dmitriyevka
 Dolgaya Polyana
 Fedoseyevka
 Glushkovka
 Golofeyevka
 Gorodishche
 Gotovye
 Grinevka
 Ignatovka
 Ilyiny
 Ivanovka
 Kaplino
 Kazachok
 Khoroshilovo
 Kotenevka
 Kotovo
 Krutoye
 Kurskoye
 Lapygino
 Lipyagi
 Logvinovka
 Luganka
 Maly Prisynok
 Menzhulyuk
 Monakovo
 Nabokino
 Nagolnoye
 Neznamovo
 Nikolayevka (Kazachanskoye Rural Settlement)
 Nikolayevka (Peschanskoye Rural Settlement)
 Nizhne-Chufichevo
 Nizhneatamanskoye
 Novaya Derevnya
 Novikovo
 Novoalexandrovka
 Novokladovoye
 Novonikolayevka
 Novosyolovka
 Obukhovka
 Okolnoye
 Ozerki
 Pasechny
 Peschanka
 Pesochny
 Petrovsky
 Plota
 Potudan
 Preobrazhenka
 Priolskoye
 Prokudino
 Rekunovka
 Rogovatoye
 Sergeyevka
 Shatalovka
 Shmarnoye
 Soldatskoye
 Sorokino
 Sumarokov
 Terekhovo
 Ternovoye
 Veliky Perevoz
 Verkhne-Chufichevoe
 Vladimirvoka
 Vorotnikovo
 Vypolzovo
 Vysoky
 Zmeyevka
 Znamenka

Valuysky District 
Rural localities in Valuysky District:

 Agoshevka
 Basovo
 Biryuch
 Borki
 Dalny
 Dronovo
 Druzhba
 Dvuluchnoye
 Filippovo
 Gerasimovka
 Kazinka
 Khmelevets
 Khokhlovo
 Khrapovo
 Koloskovo
 Kolykhalino
 Kukuyevka
 Luchka
 Mandrovo
 Maslovka
 Mayskoye
 Nasonovo
 Novokazatskoye
 Orekhovo
 Ovchinnikovo
 Printsevka
 Pristen
 Romashovka
 Roshchino
 Rovnoye
 Rozhdestveno
 Selivanovo
 Shelayevo
 Shushpanovo
 Soloti
 Staraya Simonovka
 Terekhovo
 Timonovo
 Uglovo
 Urayevo
 Vatunino
 Verkhny Moisey
 Yablonovo

Veydelevsky District 
Rural localities in Veydelevsky District:

 Bankino
 Bely Kolodez
 Bolshiye Lipyagi
 Dolgoye
 Klimenki
 Kubraki
 Malakeyevo
 Nekhayevka
 Nikolayevka
 Opytny
 Pogrebitsky
 Pridorozhny
 Solontsy
 Viktoropol
 Volchy
 Zakutskoye
 Zenino

Volokonovsky District 
Rural localities in Volokonovsky District:

 Abalmasov
 Afonyevka
 Alexandrovka
 Alexeyevka
 Bochanka
 Borisovka
 Chapelnoye
 Davydkin
 Foshchevatovo
 Gayevka
 Golofeyevka
 Grigoryevka
 Grushevka
 Khutorishche
 Kiselev
 Konovalovo
 Korovino
 Kozlovka
 Krasivy
 Krasnaya Niva
 Krasnoye Gorodishche
 Krasny Pakhar
 Krinichnoye
 Lazurnoye
 Lutovinovo
 Malinovo
 Nina
 Nizhniye Lubyanki
 Novaya Dolina
 Novoalexandrovka
 Novodevichy
 Novoivanovka
 Novorozhdestvenka
 Novoye
 Novy
 Odintsov
 Oleynitsky
 Olkhov
 Orlinoye
 Oskolishche
 Otradnoye
 Pervomaysky
 Ploskoye
 Plotovka
 Plotva
 Plotvyanka
 Pogromets
 Pokrovka
 Pytochny
 Ray
 Repyevka
 Shakhovka
 Shchepkin
 Shenshinovka
 Shidlovka
 Sredniye Lubyanki
 Staroivanovka
 Staroseltsevo
 Stary
 Stolbishche
 Tishanka
 Tolmachyov
 Ulyanovka
 Uspenka
 Verkhniye Lubyanki
 Verneyablonovo
 Verny
 Vetchininovo
 Vladimirovka
 Volchy-Pervy
 Volchy-Vtoroy
 Volchya Alexandrovka
 Yekaterinovka
 Yevdokimov
 Yutanovka
 Zelyony Klin

Yakovlevsky District 
Rural localities in Yakovlevsky District:

 Alexeyevka
 Butovo
 Bykovka
 Dmitriyevka
 Gostishchevo
 Kazatskoye
 Krivtsovo
 Kustovoye
 Moshchenoye
 Sazhnoye
 Smorodino
 Streletskoye
 Ternovka
 Verkhny Olshanets
 Zavidovka

See also 

 
 Lists of rural localities in Russia

References 

Belgorod Oblast